Suffolk Constabulary is the territorial police force responsible for policing Suffolk in East Anglia, England. The force serves a population of 761,000 in a mostly rural area of 1,466 square miles (3,796 km2), including 49 miles of coastline and the Southern part of the Broads National Park. Headquartered in Martlesham, Suffolk is responsible for Ipswich, Lowestoft, Bury St Edmunds and Felixstowe. As of September 2022, the force has a strength of approximately 1,387 police constables, and as of March 2022, 111 special constables, 880 police staff/designated officers, 36 PCSO's and 133 police support volunteers. The Chief Constable is currently Rachel Kearton, and the Police and Crime Commissioner Tim Passmore (Conservative).

Organisation
Suffolk Constabulary is responsible for policing Suffolk's 4 major settlements, Ipswich, Lowestoft, Bury St Edmunds and Felixstowe.

It is also responsible for Suffolk's 49 miles of coastline, along with many rivers, including the southern Broads National Park. It also has responsibility for the Port of Felixstowe, the largest shipping container port in Britain.

Sizewell Nuclear Power Stations 
In conjunction with the Civil Nuclear Constabulary, Suffolk is responsible for Sizewell A & B, on the East Suffolk coastline.

Military Bases 
Suffolk is home to a number of major Army, RAF and USAF military bases, of which it works closely with. These include Wattisham Air Station, Mildenhall and Lakenheath. A man breached security during an incident in 2021 at Mildenhall, which Suffolk Police helped to quickly resolve.

Eastern Region Special Operations Unit (ERSOU) 
Created in 2010, ERSOU is funded by the seven police forces that make up the eastern region, with Bedfordshire Police being the lead force. It is primarily responsible for the combined Regional Organised Crime Unit and Counter Terrorism Policing.

Collaboration

Norfolk and Suffolk Collaboration 
Norfolk Constabulary and Suffolk Constabulary have collaborated numerous services together since 2010. An extensive programme of collaborative work has already delivered a number of joint units and departments in areas such as Major Investigations, Protective Services, Custody, Transport, HR, Finance and ICT. In 2020/21, £20 million was saved due to the collaboration for Suffolk.

7 Force / Eastern Region Collaboration 
The 7 Force Collaboration Programme includes Bedfordshire, Cambridgeshire, Hertfordshire, Norfolk, Suffolk, Essex and Kent police forces.  This strategic collaboration programme was established in 2015 to develop and implement successful collaborative solutions to protect the frontline local delivery of policing. It collaborates on areas including Procurement, Training, Firearms, Driver Management, Digital Assets, Vetting and Forensics, along with ERSOU.

Suffolk Fire and Rescue Service 
The police and Suffolk Fire & Rescue share a number of joint stations, allowing for closer collaboration between the services. A number of the joint stations are also host to the East of England Ambulance Service.

History

19th and 20th century 
The force formed from the merger of West Suffolk Constabulary and East Suffolk Constabulary. Those forces had previously been merged in 1869 and the split again in 1899. The most recent merger took place in 1967, which also saw the Ipswich Borough Police merged.

21st century 
In 2006, Suffolk Constabulary merged the role of traffic warden with that of PCSO.

Proposals announced by the then Home Secretary Charles Clarke in  2006 would have seen the force merge with neighbouring forces Norfolk Constabulary and Cambridgeshire Constabulary to form a strategic police force for East Anglia. However, the proposals were later abandoned.

In 2019, the UK Prime Minister announced that 20,000 new police officers would be recruited as part of a national uplift programme. Suffolk was allocated 179 of those new officers, which would bring the force strength up to more than 1,400 police officers by 2023.

In 2020, Suffolk recruited more female officers than male officers, being one of only eight forces in the UK to achieve this.

In 2022, Suffolk begun training recruits under the new Police Education Qualifications Framework (PEQF), which sees a partnership of training with Anglia Ruskin University.

Chief constables 
19671968 : Sir Peter Jack Matthews (formerly chief constable of East Suffolk and afterwards chief constable of Surrey, 1968–72)
19701976 : Arthur Burns
19761983 : Stuart Leonard Whiteley
19891998 : Anthony Thomas Coe
19982002 : Sir Paul Joseph Scott-Lee (afterwards Chief Constable of the West Midlands, 2002)
20032007 : Alastair McWhirter
2007?? : Simon Ash
20132015 : Douglas Paxton
20162019 : Gareth Wilson
20192022 : Steve Jupp
2022present: Rachel Kearton

Fast Justice (TV documentary series) 
In 2020, Suffolk's Sentinel Teams were at the focus of a 10 part television series which aired on Dave. The Sentinel teams use state of the art Automatic Number Plate Recognition technology which provides instant access to a network of cameras across the country, and they drive high performance, customised BMWs. The Sentinel teams provide enhanced coverage of Suffolk's road network to proactively disrupt serious and organised criminal activity as well as to increase police visibility. Sentinel officers also support the force's response policing and Safer Neighbourhood Teams, and offer additional operational options, making use of a wide range of proactive policing tactics and technology.

Notable investigations

Suffolk Constabulary gained widespread attention in December 2006, when it began to investigate the murder of five women working as prostitutes in the Ipswich area. The murders generated media interest both nationally and internationally. The inquiry was the largest mounted by Suffolk Police in its history.

The disappearance of Corrie McKeague launched another unusually large investigation, involving officers from other constabularies and civilian volunteers.

Governance and budget 
Since 2012, the force has been overseen by Tim Passmore (Conservative) who is the Suffolk Police and Crime Commissioner. Since 2019, the chief constable is Steve Jupp.

Suffolk Constabulary's budget for 2021/2022 is £151.5million.

See also
Policing in the United Kingdom

References

External links

 Suffolk Constabulary at HMICFRS

Police forces of England
Organisations based in Suffolk
1967 establishments in England
Government agencies established in 1967